Pavlos Voskopoulos (born 25 November 1964) or Pavle Voskopulos is a Greek politician, a member of the collective leadership of the Rainbow party that represents the Slavic-speaking minority (identifying as ethnic Macedonian) in Greek Macedonia.

Background
Voskopoulos, an ethnic Macedonian, was born in 1964 in Florina, Greece, to a Macedonian-speaking family. He also uses the Slavic patronymic Filipov (Филипов), his family's traditional name, which was changed to Voskopoulos (his application to change back was rejected by the Greek government). He is first cousins with Mayor of Florina, Ioannis Voskopoulos who has a strong Greek identity. In 1988 he finished an Architect's degree in Belgrade, Yugoslavia. In 1989 he helped to found the Macedonian Movement for Balkan Prosperity (MAKIVE) which was based in Aridaia, along with four others; Dimitris Papadimitriou, Traianos Pasois, Kostas Tasopoulos and Petros Dimtsis. MAKIVE never participated in any elections. His first cousin Ioannis Voskopoulos, an elected Administrator of Florina prefecture, as well as other members of his family, self-identify as Greeks.

Rainbow party
In 1994 he helped to found the Rainbow party, of which he has been one of the leading figures since then. The party opened its first office in the Greek city of Florina on 6 September 1995. On 14 September he, along with three other members of the Rainbow Party were charged with "having caused and incited mutual hatred among the citizens" by the local Florina court. Soon organisations such as Amnesty International came to the support of the members of the Rainbow Party, claiming that they would become "prisoners of conscience" if they were to be jailed for the offence.

Public appearances
He has been a prominent figure in Greek media, with numerous appearances in talkshows, and in media of the neighbouring North Macedonia. He has attracted criticism for his positions and activities, given their controversial nature (for more see Macedonia naming dispute).

References

1964 births
Slavic speakers of Greek Macedonia
Living people
People from Florina
Rainbow (Greece) politicians